Philosophy & Theology & Mysticism Quarterly Book Review (PTMBR), formerly Ketab-é Mah-é Falsafeh, is a Persian-language journal, specializing in the review of books about philosophy, theology and mysticism. It is published four times a year and covers all areas of and approaches to philosophy. Begun as a publication of Iran Book House in 1997 by its first editor and publisher, Ali Asghar Mohammadkhani, the journal changed its name to PTMBR in 2014. In 2014 editorship of PTMBR passed to Malek Shojaee of the Institute for Humanities and Cultural Studies. The journal is published in Tehran.

References

External links
 Official website

1997 establishments in Iran
Book review magazines
Magazines established in 1997
Magazines published in Tehran
Persian-language journals
Philosophy magazines
Quarterly magazines
Iran Book House